Wilhelm "Willi" Melliger (26 July 1953 – 16 January 2018) was a Swiss equestrian and Olympic medalist. With his horse Calvaro V, he won two Olympic silver medals: the first in show jumping at the 1996 Summer Olympics in Atlanta and the second as part of team jumping at the 2000 Summer Olympics in Sydney.

Melliger died on 16 January 2018 from complications of a stroke that he suffered in December 2017. He was 64.

References

External links
 

1953 births
2018 deaths
Swiss male equestrians
Olympic equestrians of Switzerland
Olympic silver medalists for Switzerland
Equestrians at the 1984 Summer Olympics
Equestrians at the 1992 Summer Olympics
Equestrians at the 1996 Summer Olympics
Equestrians at the 2000 Summer Olympics
Olympic medalists in equestrian
Medalists at the 2000 Summer Olympics
Medalists at the 1996 Summer Olympics
People from Muri District
Horse trader
Sportspeople from Aargau